The Blue Mosque in Istanbul, also known by its official name, the Sultan Ahmed Mosque, is an Ottoman-era historical imperial mosque located in Istanbul, Turkey. A functioning mosque, it also attracts large numbers of tourist visitors. It was constructed between 1609 and 1616 during the rule of Ahmed I. Its Külliye contains Ahmed's tomb, a madrasah and a hospice. Hand-painted blue tiles adorn the mosque’s interior walls, and at night the mosque is bathed in blue as lights frame the mosque’s five main domes, six minarets and eight secondary domes. It sits next to the Hagia Sophia, the principal mosque of Istanbul until the Blue Mosque's construction and another popular tourist site. The Blue Mosque was included in the UNESCO World Heritage Site list in 1985 under the name of "Historic Areas of Istanbul".

History 
After the Peace of Zsitvatorok and the crushing loss in the 1603–18 war with Persia, Sultan Ahmed I decided to build a large mosque in Istanbul to reassert Ottoman power. It would be the first imperial mosque for more than forty years. While his predecessors had paid for their mosques with the spoils of war, Ahmed I procured funds from the Treasury, because he had not gained remarkable victories. The construction was started in 1609 and completed in 1616.

Having been paid from the public treasury rather than from the sultan's war booty, as was done normally, it caused the anger of the ulama, the Muslim jurists. The mosque was built on the site of the palace of the Byzantine emperors, in front of the basilica Hagia Sophia (at that time, the primary imperial mosque in Istanbul) and the hippodrome, a site of significant symbolic meaning as it dominated the city skyline from the south. Big parts of the south shore of the mosque rest on the foundations, the vaults of the old Grand Palace.

Architecture 

The Blue Mosque has five main domes, six minarets, and eight secondary domes. The design is the culmination of two centuries of Ottoman mosque development. It incorporates many Byzantine elements of the neighboring Hagia Sophia with traditional Islamic architecture and is considered to be the last great mosque of the classical period. The architect, Sedefkâr Mehmed Ağa, synthesized the ideas of his master Sinan, aiming for overwhelming size, majesty and splendor. The upper area is decorated with approximately 20,000 hand-painted glazed ceramic in 60 different tulip patterns. The lower stories are illuminated by 200 stained glass windows. The mosque is preceded by a forecourt with a large fountain and special area for ablution. An iron chain hangs in the court entrance on the western side. Only the Sultan was allowed to ride into the mosque horseback, and he would need to lower his head to not hit the chain, a symbolic gesture ensuring the humility of the ruler before Allah.

By way of his works he left a decided mark on Istanbul. The square on which the Blue Mosque is situated became known as Sultanahmet. This mosque can be considered the culmination of his career. Mehmed Agha, who was the last student of Mimar Sinan, had completed his mission by adding his brighter, colorful architectural style to that of his master teacher.

Interior 

At its lower levels and at every pier, the interior of the mosque is lined with more than 20,000 handmade İznik style ceramic tiles, made at İznik (the ancient Nicaea) in more than fifty different tulip designs. The tiles at lower levels are traditional in design, while at gallery level their design becomes flamboyant with representations of flowers, fruit and cypresses. The tiles were made under the supervision of the İznik master. The price to be paid for each tile was fixed by the sultan's decree, while tile prices in general increased over time. As a result, the quality of the tiles used in the building decreased gradually.

The upper levels of the interior are dominated by blue paint. More than 200 stained glass windows with intricate designs admit natural light, today assisted by chandeliers. On the chandeliers, ostrich eggs are found that were meant to avoid cobwebs inside the mosque by repelling spiders. The decorations include verses from the Qur'an, many of them made by Seyyid Kasim Gubari, regarded as the greatest calligrapher of his time. The floors are covered with carpets, which are donated by the faithful and are regularly replaced as they wear out. The many spacious windows confer a spacious impression. The casements at floor level are decorated with opus sectile. Each exedra has five windows, some of which are blind. Each semi-dome has 14 windows and the central dome 28 (four of which are blind). The coloured glass for the windows was a gift of the Signoria of Venice to the sultan.

The most important element in the interior of the mosque is the mihrab, which is made of finely carved and sculptured marble, with a stalactite niche and a double inscriptive panel above it. It is surrounded by many windows. The adjacent walls are sheathed in ceramic tiles. To the right of the mihrab is the richly decorated minber, or pulpit, where the imam stands when he is delivering his sermon at the time of noon prayer on Fridays or on holy days. The mosque has been designed so that even when it is at its most crowded, everyone in the mosque can see and hear the imam.

The royal kiosk is situated at the south-east corner. It comprises a platform, a loggia and two small retiring rooms. It gives access to the royal loge in the south-east upper gallery of the mosque. These retiring rooms became the headquarters of the Grand Vizier during the suppression of the rebellious Janissary Corps in 1826. The royal loge (hünkâr mahfil) is supported by ten marble columns. It has its own mihrab, which used to be decorated with a jade rose and gilt and with one hundred Qurans on an inlaid and gilded lecterns.

The many lamps inside the mosque were once covered with gold and gems. Among the glass bowls one could find ostrich eggs and crystal balls. All these decorations have been removed or pillaged for museums.

The great tablets on the walls are inscribed with the names of the caliphs and verses from the Quran. They were originally by the great 17th-century calligrapher Seyyid Kasim Gubari of Diyarbakır but have been repeatedly restored.

It was first announced that the mosque would undertake a series of renovations back in 2016. Numerous renovation works had been completed throughout Istanbul and the restoration of the Blue Mosque was to be the final project. Renovations were expected to take place over three and a half years and be completed by 2020.

Exterior 

The façade of the spacious forecourt was built in the same manner as the façade of the Süleymaniye Mosque, except for the addition of the turrets on the corner domes. The court is about as large as the mosque itself and is surrounded by a continuous vaulted arcade (revak). It has ablution facilities on both sides. The central hexagonal fountain is small relative to the courtyard. The monumental but narrow gateway to the courtyard stands out architecturally from the arcade. Its semi-dome has a fine stalactite structure, crowned by a small ribbed dome on a tall tholobate. Its historical elementary school (Sıbyan Mektebi) is used as "Mosque Information Centre" which is adjacent to its outer wall on the side of Hagia Sophia. This is where they provide visitors with a free orientational presentation on the Blue Mosque and Islam in general.

A heavy iron chain hangs in the upper part of the court entrance on the western side. Only the sultan was allowed to enter the court of the mosque on horseback. The chain was put there, so that the sultan had to lower his head every single time he entered the court to avoid being hit. This was a symbolic gesture, to ensure the humility of the ruler in the face of the divine.

Minarets 

The Blue Mosque is one of the five mosques in Turkey that has six minarets (one in the modern Sabancı Mosque in Adana, the Muğdat Mosque in Mersin, Çamlıca Mosque in Üsküdar and the Green mosque in Arnavutköy). According to folklore, an architect misheard the Sultan's request for "altın minareler" (gold minarets) as "altı minare" (six minarets), a feature then-unique to the mosque of the Ka'aba in Mecca. When criticized for his presumption, the Sultan then ordered a seventh minaret to be built at the Mecca mosque.

Four minarets stand at the corners of the Blue Mosque. Each of these fluted, pencil-shaped minarets has three balconies (Called şerefe) with stalactite corbels, while the two others at the end of the forecourt only have two balconies. Before, the muezzin or prayer caller had to climb a narrow spiral staircase five times a day to announce the call to prayer.

Pope Benedict XVI's visit 

Pope Benedict XVI visited the Blue Mosque on 30 November 2006 during his visit to Turkey. It was only the second papal visit in history to a Muslim place of worship. Having removed his shoes, the Pope paused for a full two minutes, eyes closed in silent meditation, standing side by side with Mustafa Çağrıcı, the Mufti of Istanbul, and Emrullah Hatipoğlu, the Imam of the Blue Mosque.

The pope “thanked divine Providence for this” and said, “May all believers identify themselves with the one God and bear witness to true brotherhood.” The pontiff noted that Turkey “will be a bridge of friendship and collaboration between East and West”, and he thanked the Turkish people “for the cordiality and sympathy” they showed him throughout his stay, saying, “he felt loved and understood.”

Gallery

See also

 Ottoman architecture
 List of mosques in Istanbul
 Hagia Sophia
 Çamlıca Mosque
 Shah Mosque
 List of tallest domes
 List of tallest structures built before the 20th century

Notes

Sources

The Inside Track, On the Go Tours.

Further reading
Sheila S. Blair, Jonathan M. Bloom – "The Art and Architecture of Islam, 1250–1800", Yale University Press, 1994; 
Turner, J. (ed.) – Grove Dictionary of Art – Oxford University Press, USA; New edition (January 2, 1996);

External links

Website of the Blue Mosque, Istanbul 
Photographs by Dick Osseman, PBase

Religious buildings and structures completed in 1616
Ottoman mosques in Istanbul
Articles containing video clips
Landmarks in Turkey
Fatih
17th-century mosques
1616 establishments in the Ottoman Empire
Historic sites in Turkey
World Heritage Sites in Turkey